opened in Fuefuki, Yamanashi Prefecture, Japan in 2005. The collection relates to the natural history, history, and culture of Yamanashi Prefecture; special exhibitions are also held.

How to get 
From Chūō Expressway Ichinomiya Misaka  IC
Takes about 10minutes
Use Fuefuki city bus from  Isawaonsen station

See also
 Kai Province
 List of Historic Sites of Japan (Yamanashi)
 List of Cultural Properties of Japan - paintings (Yamanashi)

References

External links
  Yamanashi Prefectural Museum
  Yamanashi Prefectural Museum

Museums in Yamanashi Prefecture
Museums established in 2005
2005 establishments in Japan
Fuefuki, Yamanashi